The Taeniidae  are a family of tapeworms.  It is the largest family representing the order Cyclophyllidea. It includes many species of medical and veterinary importance, as Taenia solium (pork tapeworm), Taenia saginata (beef tapeworm), and Echinococcus granulosus. The Taeniidae are parasites of mammals and many are infectious to humans.

Taxonomy

The family includes four genera:
Echinococcus Rudolphi, 1801  
Hydatigera Lamarck, 1816 
Taenia Linnaeus, 1758 
Versteria Nakao, Lavikainen, Iwaki, Haukisalmi, Konyaev, Oku, Okamoto & Ito, 2013

Life cycle

Taeniidae parasites are distinguished by their terrestrial lifecycles, which include a dormant stage called a metacestode. These develop in the intermediate host's tissue when eggs are consumed.  The eggs hatch into an oncosphere, which passes through the intestinal wall and forms the metacestode.  An example is either cysticercoid, cysticercus, or a hydatid cyst.  The definitive host is infected when the metacestode is consumed.

References

Cestoda
Platyhelminthes families